Countess Konstancja Potocka (1781 – December 25, 1852) was a Polish noblewoman, translator and illustrator.

She was the daughter of Stanisław Szczęsny Potocki. She married Jan Potocki in 1799, and Edward Raczyński in 1817.
During her second marriage, she was a known figure in Polish literary life. She co- founded the Raczyński library in Poznań (1829), and translated, illustrated and published German works.

References
 Jerzy Łojek: Potomkowie Szczęsnego: Dzieje fortuny Potockich z Tulczyna 1799-1921. Lublin: Wydawnictwo Lubelskie, 1983. .

External links
 Biography

1781 births
1852 deaths
People from Tulchyn
People from Bracław Voivodeship
Konstancja
Polish translators
Polish illustrators
19th-century Polish women
19th-century translators